Strategy Challenges Collection 1 (also known as Strategy Games of the World) is a 1995 educational video game created by Edmark. A sequel was released in 1997 entitled Strategy Challenges Collection 2: In the Wild.

Gameplay
The games each feature three strategy games that the user can play against the computer or another user. In the first game, they are Nine men's morris, Gomoku, and Mancala. In 2, these games are Tablut, Jungle (called "Jungle Chess" in the program) and Surakarta.

Each game has three levels and provides the user with the ability to decide whether a computer opponent will play offensively or defensively. There are six computer opponent characters (two for each of the three levels) and each always plays either offensively or defensively. However, each of them appear on a different level in each game. If one plays another user instead of the computer, the leveling will not have any effect on gameplay.

Reception
Strategy Challenge: Collection II was a finalist for the Computer Game Developers Conference's 1996 "Best Educational Game" Spotlight Award, but lost the prize to Freddi Fish 2.

References

External links

1995 video games
1997 video games
Children's educational video games
Classic Mac OS games
Video games developed in the United States
Windows games
Multiple-game video board games